The Azerbaijani National Badminton Championships is a tournament organized to crown the best badminton players in Azerbaijan. They are held since the season 1996/1997.

Past winners

Junior champions

References
Badminton Europe - Details of affiliated national organisations

Badminton in Azerbaijan
National badminton championships
Sports competitions in Azerbaijan
Recurring sporting events established in 1996